Mitchell Joachim (pronounced /jo-ak-um/; born February 3, 1972) is an architect and urban designer. He is the Co-Founder of Terreform ONE, and an Associate Professor of Practice at NYU. Previously he was the Frank Gehry Chair at University of Toronto and a faculty member at Pratt, Columbia, Syracuse, Washington, The New School, and the European Graduate School.

Recognition 
Mitchell has been awarded a Fulbright Scholarship, LafargeHolcim Foundation Award, ARCHITECT R+D Award, Senior Fellowship at TED 2011, Moshe Safdie and Assoc. Fellowship, and Martin Society for Sustainability Fellowship at MIT. He won the Zumtobel Group Award, History Channel and Infiniti Design Excellence Award for the City of the Future, and Time Magazine Best Invention of the Year 2007, MIT Car w/ MIT Smart Cities. His project, Fab Tree Hab, has been exhibited at MoMA and widely published.  He was selected by Wired magazine for "The 2008 Smart List: 15 People the Next President Should Listen To".  Rolling Stone magazine honored Mitchell as an agent of change in "The 100 People Who Are Changing America". In 2009 he was interviewed on the Colbert Report Popular Science magazine has featured his work as a visionary for “The Future of the Environment” in 2010. Mitchell was the Winner of the Victor Papanek Social Design Award sponsored by the University of Applied Arts Vienna, the Austrian Cultural Forum New York, and the Museum of Arts and Design in 2011. Dwell magazine featured Mitchell as one of "The NOW 99" in 2012. He won the American Institute of Architects New York, Urban Design Merit Award for; Terreform ONE, Urbaneer Resilient Waterfront Infrastructure, 2013.

Education 
He earned a Ph.D. at Massachusetts Institute of Technology, in the Dept. of Architecture, Design and Computation program , a Master of Architecture in Urban Design (MAUD) at Harvard Graduate School of Design (GSD), a M.Arch at Columbia University GSAPP, and a BPS at the University at Buffalo, The State University of New York with Honors.

Design projects 
 Fab Tree Hab
 MIT Car
 Cricket Shelter and Modular Edible Insect Farm 
 Rapid Re(f)use
 Urbaneering Brooklyn: City of the Future
 SOFT XO Lamb Car
 Green Brain: Smart Park for a New City
 New York 2106: Self-Sufficient City
 Jetpack Packing and Blimp Bumper Bus

Selected publications 
 Mitchell Joachim, Maria Aiolova, and Terreform ONE. Design with Life: Biotech Architecture and Resilient Cities, Actar, 2019.
Mitchell Joachim, Mike Silver. XXL-XS: New Directions in Ecological Design, Actar, 2017.
 Anker, Peder, Harpman, Louise, and Mitchell Joachim. Global Design: Elsewhere Envisioned, Prestel/ Random House, 2014.
 Tandon, Nina and Mitchell Joachim. Super Cells: Building with Biology. TED Books, 2014.
 Lasky, Julie, The Beauty of Bacteria, The New York Times, pp. D1, D7, Thur. Jan. 17, 2013.
 Myers, William (ed.), Bio Design: Nature + Science + Creativity, Thames & Hudson, The Museum of Modern Art, pp. 10, 58–61. 2012.
 Bergman, David, Sustainable Design: A Critical Guide, Princeton Architectural Press, p 135. 2012.
 Bua,Matt and Maximillian Goldfarb (ed.), Architectural Inventions: Visionary Drawings, Laurence King Publishing, pp. 20, 72, 144, 318. 2012.
 Amoroso, Nadia, Digital Landscape Architecture Now, Thames & Hudson. pp. 17, 242–247. 2012.
 Budds, Diana, “The Now 99, The Future of Housing,” Dwell, May, p. 102, 120. 2012.
 Mitchell Joachim, "The Necessity of All Scales: Planetary Design in the Age of Globality," Ecological Urban Architecture, Thomas Schroepfer (ed.), Birkhäuser, pp. 174–184. 2012.
 Mitchell Joachim, "Envisioning Ecological Cities; Rapid Re(f)use, One Hour Tower, Homeway," Sustainable Urbanism and Beyond: Rethinking Cities for the Future, Tigran Haas (ed.), Rizzoli, pp. 240–245. 2012.
 Mitchell Joachim and Maria Aiolova, “Design as a Resource for All Recourses,” Futuristic: Visions of Future Living, Caroline Klein, Prof. Dr. Stefanie Lieb (ed.), DAAB, pp. 242–249. 2012.
 Mitchell Joachim, "The Art of Cities," City Vision, Francesco Lipari, Federico Giacomarra (ed.), issue #7, autumn/winter, pp. 64–71. 2012.
 Mitchell Joachim, “Envisioning Ecological Cities,” Ecological Urbanism, Mohsen Mostafavi and Gareth Doherty (ed.), pp. 224–29, Harvard University GSD, Lars Muller Publishers, 2010.
 John Bradley, "Future of The Environment: The Urban Remodeler," Popular Science, pp. cover, 7, 46–47, July 2010.
 Mitchell Joachim, “Agora: Dreams and Visions,” l’Arca, pp. 4– 11, N° 246, April, 2009.
 Mitchell Joachim, “Housing for the 21st Century; Urban Refuse, Housing & Wall-E,” eVolo magazine, pp. 62–63, issue 01, Fall, 2009.
 Maywa Montenegro, “The Seed Salon: Thomas Lovejoy & Mitchell Joachim,” Seed, pp. 39–44, issue #22, June, 2009.
 Matt Pascarella, “Philippe Starck & Mitchell Joachim; Designs for Violence, Ecology, Religion & Politics”, TAR, pp. 198–209, Issue 2, Spring, 2009.
 “The RS 100: Agents of Change,” Rolling Stone, p. 63, April 2, 2009.
 Tom Vanderbilt, “The 2008 Smart List: Mitchell Joachim, Redesign Cities from Scratch,” Wired, pp. 178–9, 16.10, Oct, 2008.
 Michelle Galindo (ed.), 1000X Architecture of the Americas, Verlagshaus Braun, p. 429, 2008.
 Tim Groen, Relax – Interiors for Human Wellness, p. 250-3, Birkhäuser, 2007.
 Linda Stern, “Terreform: Building Houses Out of Living Trees,” Newsweek, p. E2, May 28, 2007.
 Craig Kellogg, “Tree/House,” Interior Design, p. 48, Vol. 78, issue #1, Jan. 1, 2007.
 Axel Ritter, Smart Materials: Types, Products, Architecture, pp. 10–11, 142, 160, Birkhäuser, 2006.
 Richard Burdett, Cities: Architecture and Society 10, Internazional Di Architettura, International Architectural Exhibition, V.1-2, p. 301, 2006.
 Robin Pogrebin, “Visions of Manhattan: For the City, 100-Year Makeovers,” The New York Times, p. A9, Nov. 4, 2006.
 Gregory Mone, “Grow Your Second Home,” Popular Science, pp. 38–9, Nov, 2006.
 Geeta Dayal, “A Sheep at the Wheel,” Intersection, Issue 03, p. 78-79, 2006.
 Mitchell Joachim, Javier Arbona, Lara Greden, “Nature's Home,” 306090 08: Autonomous Urbanism, Kjersti Monson & Alex Duval, ed., NY: Princeton Architectural Press, 2005.
 David J. Brown, The HOME House Project: The Future of Affordable Housing, MIT Press, 2005.
 Phil Patton, “At M.I.T., Rethinking the Car for City Life,” The New York Times, p. D9, Sep. 6, 2004.
 Catherine Fox, “How Harvard would remake Atlanta,” Atlanta Journal-Constitution, Jun. 3, 2001.

See also
 Pleaching

References

External links 
 Archinode Studio
 Terreform ONE
 Mitchell Joachim Faculty Page at European Graduate School
 Mitchell Joachim – Articles, Interviews and Reviews
 
 "Don't build your home, grow it!" (TED2010)
 Dwell magazine: The Future of Housing

1972 births
Living people
20th-century American architects
American industrial designers
Columbia Graduate School of Architecture, Planning and Preservation alumni
Academic staff of European Graduate School
Futurologists
Harvard Graduate School of Design alumni
MIT School of Architecture and Planning alumni
New York University faculty
Sustainability advocates
Urban designers
Architects from New Jersey
21st-century American architects